Sergio Floccari (born 12 November 1981) is a former Italian footballer who plays as a striker.

Club career

Early career
Floccari began playing football as a junior with the local side of his town, Nicotera, before moving into the youth system of Catanzaro. He began senior career with Avezzano and Promozione team Montebelluna before moving up to Serie C2 with Mestre and Faenza. It was at Faenza, under coach Carlo Regno, assistant to 2009–10 Lazio coach Davide Ballardini, that Floccari first bloomed, scoring many goals.

Rise
Following his successful period at Faenza, he joined Genoa in 2002, but did not establish himself as a regular, playing just nine league games and scoring one goal in his first season of Serie B.

Floccari took a step back into Serie C2, joining Rimini in co-ownership deal where he played and scored regularly. His goals contributed to successful promotions as Rimini went from playing in C2 to Serie B during his time there. The club also bought him outright in June 2003.

In January 2006, Floccari's form was rewarded when Serie A strugglers Messina signed him (jointly-signed with Atalanta from Rimini) as they looked to avoid relegation. Floccari scored three times as Messina survived thanks to the Calciopoli scandal. Two of those goals came in a 2–2 draw with Juventus. In June 2006, Messina bought the remain rights from Atalanta. In his first full season of Serie A in 2006–07, Floccari scored only twice as Messina finished last.

Atalanta
The Calabrese striker did not return to Serie B with his Messina teammates though. Atalanta re-signed him for a fee of €1.875 million (€1.675 million plus defender Mariano Stendardo).

At Atalanta, Floccari battled for a starting place with the likes of Simone Inzaghi, Antonio Langella and Riccardo Zampagna. Floccari scored his first goal against league champions Inter and after Zampagna's bust-up with coach Luigi Delneri (which resulted in the striker's departure to Vicenza Calcio), Floccari's first-team opportunities increased, and he closed out the 2007–08 season with eight league goals.

In 2008–09, Floccari improved yet again, scoring twelve league goals as Atalanta comfortably finished in mid table.

Return to Genoa
On 1 July 2009, Floccari returned to Genoa, the club he left in 2003, for €9.1 million. 
He scored on debut in a 4–1 win over Napoli and scored his first goal in the Europa League against Valencia. Having scored four league goals, Floccari was struggling to find space in the Genoa attack with coach Gian Piero Gasperini preferring the likes of Giuseppe Sculli and Raffaele Palladino. That transfer windows also saw a three-men three-way swap formed, which Floccari moved to Lazio to replace Goran Pandev who left for Inter on free transfer, and Genoa got David Suazo from Inter. The three strikers all had an unsuccessful days in the first half of the season.

Lazio
As a result, Floccari sealed a loan move to struggling Lazio, for €500,000. He made his debut after just one training session and scored twice in a 4–1 win over Livorno. Following that, Floccari made a surprising impact on the team, and was one of the key players in guiding the club to 12th in the league, well clear of the relegation zone. He missed a vital penalty in the defeat against Roma in the vital derby, but made up for it by scoring the winner against former club Genoa seven days later, a result that all but granted Lazio's Serie A status for 2010–11. At the end of season Lazio signed him permanently for a €8.5 million transfer fee having agreed a four-year contract.

Parma
On 31 August 2011, Floccari was loaned to Parma for €1.5 million.

Return to Lazio

Sassuolo
On 30 January 2014, Floccari was sold to fellow Serie A club Sassuolo for €2 million.

Bologna
On 11 January 2016, Floccari officially joined Serie A club Bologna for an undisclosed fee. He missed three weeks of the 2016–17 season through injury.

SPAL
On 19 January 2017, Floccari signed a one-year deal with Serie B side SPAL. Two days later, he made his debut for the club in a 2–0 league win over Benevento. Floccari's first goal in a SPAL shirt came in stoppage time to seal the victory for the home side, after defender Francesco Vicari gave them the lead just before the break. On 13 April 2019, he scored the winner in a shock 2–1 victory over reigning champions Juventus.

International career
In October 2010, he was called up for the first and only time by new national team coach Cesare Prandelli for the Euro 2012 qualifiers against Northern Ireland and Serbia, as a replacement for the injured Alberto Gilardino; he didn't make an appearance in either game. Floccari married former Miss San Marino Maria Elisa Canti, and has Sammarinese citizenship, so is eligible for the San Marino national football team.

Career statistics

Club

1 1 match in 2002–03 playoffs
2 2 matches in 2003–04 playoffs
3 Not included match in Coppa Italia Lega Pro and regional cups
4 Note 1, 2 and 3

Honours
Lazio
Coppa Italia: 2012–13

References

External links
 Atalanta B.C. Official Player Profile 
 Career profile (from La Gazzetta dello Sport) 

1981 births
Living people
People from Vibo Valentia
Italian footballers
Sammarinese footballers
Sammarinese people of Italian descent
Association football forwards
Serie A players
Serie B players
Rimini F.C. 1912 players
A.C.R. Messina players
Atalanta B.C. players
Genoa C.F.C. players
Calcio Montebelluna players
S.S. Lazio players
Parma Calcio 1913 players
U.S. Sassuolo Calcio players
Bologna F.C. 1909 players
S.P.A.L. players
Avezzano Calcio players
Sportspeople from the Province of Vibo Valentia
Footballers from Calabria